The Port of Liverpool Staff Association was a trade union in the United Kingdom. It was established in 1969 as part of the Association of Clerical, Technical and Supervisory Staffs, itself part of the Transport and General Workers' Union. It replaced the Mersey Docks and Harbour Board Salaried Staff Organisation, which was not a trade union.

References
Modern Records Centre, University of Warwick

Port of Liverpool
Defunct trade unions of the United Kingdom
Port workers' trade unions
1969 establishments in England
Transport and General Workers' Union amalgamations
Trade unions based in Merseyside